Statistics of Bahraini Premier League for the 2005–06 season.

Overview
It was contested by 10 teams, and Muharraq Club won the championship.

League standings

References
Bahrain - List of final tables (RSSSF)

Bahraini Premier League seasons
1
Bah